Yerevanlı or Yerevanly may refer to:
İrəvanlı, Goranboy, Azerbaijan
İrəvanlı, Tartar, Azerbaijan
İrəvanlı, Yevlakh, Azerbaijan